The 2022 Nebraska State Legislature elections took place as part of the biennial United States elections. Nebraska voters elected state senators in the 24 even-numbered seats of the 49 legislative districts in the Nebraska Unicameral as well as in a special election for the 31st District. State senators serve four-year terms in the unicameral Nebraska Legislature.

Retirements

Term limited

Democrats
District 26: Matt Hansen
District 28: Patty Pansing Brooks
District 46: Adam Morfeld

Republicans
District 4: Robert Hilkemann
District 18: Brett Lindstrom
District 20: John S. McCollister
District 24: Mark Kolterman
District 34: Curt Friesen
District 36: Matt Williams
District 42: Mike Groene
District 44: Dan Hughes
District 48: John Stinner

Not seeking reelection

Democrats
District 12: Steve Lathrop retired.

Republicans
District 40: Tim Gragert retired.

Close races

Race by district
Note: All elections are technically non-partisan in the State Legislature; therefore, parties listed here are from candidates' websites and official party endorsement lists. Candidates all appear on the ballot as nonpartisan.
Candidates endorsed by the Republican Party:
Candidates endorsed by the Democratic Party:

District 2

Declared
 Robert Clements, banker (incumbent)
 Sarah Slattery, chef and school food program manager
 Schuyler Windham, lawyer and entrepreneur
 Janet Chung, former chair of the Lancaster County Democratic Party

Endorsements

Disqualified/withdrawn
 Michelle Bates, corporate executive assistant

Results

District 4

Declared
 Cindy Maxwell-Ostdiek
 R. Brad von Gillern

Results

District 6

Declared
 Machaela Cavanaugh, nonprofit development director (incumbent)
 Christian Mirch
 Elizabeth Hallgren

Results

District 8
Declared
 Megan Hunt, small business owner (incumbent)
 Katie Opitz
 Marilyn Arant Asher

Results

District 10
Declared
 Wendy DeBoer, lawyer and academic (incumbent)
 Lou Ann Goding, former Omaha Public Schools board president

Results

District 12
Declared
 Haile Kucera, small business owner
 Robin Richards, Vice President of the Ralston Public Schools Board
 Merv Riepe, former state senator
 Bob Borgeson, union leader
Did not file
 Bryce Lukowski, conservative activist

Results

District 14
Declared
 John Arch, former healthcare executive (incumbent)
 Cori Villegas, healthcare worker and after-school program volunteer
 Rob Plugge, software developer

Results

District 16
Declared
 Ben Hansen, chiropractor (incumbent)
 Connie Petersen, psychologist

Results

District 18
Declared
 Clarice Jackson, nonprofit CEO
 Christy Armendariz
 Michael Young, technology consultant

Results

District 20

Declared
 Stu Dornan, attorney 
 John Fredrickson, mental health provider and adjunct professor
 Julie Fredrickson, realtor

Results

District 22
Declared
 Mike Moser, small business owner (incumbent)
 Mike Goos, school psychologist and candidate for Nebraska State Board of Education District 3 in 2020
 Roy M. Zach, candidate for this seat in 2010

Results

District 24
Declared
 Jana Hughes, member of the Seward Public School Board 
 Patrick Hotovy, physician

Results

District 26
Declared
 George Dungan III, public defense attorney
 Bob Van Valkenburg, business owner and perennial candidate
 Russ Barger
 Larry Weixelman, candidate for this seat in 2014

Endorsements

Results

District 28

Declared
 Jane Raybould, Lincoln City Councilwoman, nominee for U.S. Senate in 2018 and nominee for Lieutenant Governor of Nebraska in 2014
 Roy Christensen, former Lincoln City Councilman

Withdrew
 Nancy Petitto, nonprofit program director and affordable housing advocate

Endorsements

Results

District 30
Declared
 Myron Dorn, farmer (incumbent)

Results

District 31 (Special)
Following the death of Senator Rich Pahls, a special election will be held to determine who will fill the seat for the remaining two years of the term.

Declared
 Kathleen Kauth, businesswoman (incumbent)
 Tim Royers, educator

Results

District 32
Declared
 Tom Brandt, farmer (incumbent)

Results

District 34

Declared 
 Loren Lippincott, US Air Force veteran, commercial pilot, and farmer 
Michael Reimers, National Guard veteran

Did not file
Arron Kowalski, farmer

Results

District 36
Declared
 Angie Lauritsen, small business owner 
 Rick Holdcroft, candidate for district 3 in 2020
Did not file
 Jim Jenkins, rancher, entrepreneur and restaurant owner

Results

District 38
Declared
 Dave Murman, farmer (incumbent)
Tyler R. Cappel, business owner and personal trainer

Results

District 40
Declared
 Barry DeKay, former chair of the Nebraska Public Power District
 Keith F. Kube, candidate for this seat in 2014 and 2018
 Mark Patefield, former mayor of Laurel
 Robert E. Johnston, director of the Nebraska Soybean Association
Declined
 Tim Gragert, farmer (incumbent)

Results

District 42
Declared
 Mike Jacobson (incumbent)
 Chris Bruns, Lincoln County Commissioner and US Marine Corps veteran
 Brenda Fourtner, independent provider
Withdrawn/disqualified
 Mel McNea, retired healthcare executive

Results

District 44
Declared
 Ed Dunn, chairman of the West Central Nebraska Development District
 Teresa Ibach, wife of former Under Secretary of Agriculture for Marketing and Regulatory Programs Greg Ibach

Results

District 46

Declared
 James Michael Bowers, Lincoln city councilman
 James Herrold
 Danielle Conrad, former Nebraska State Senator

Endorsements

Results

District 48
Don L. Lease II, farmer
Brian Hardin, businessman
Talon Cordle
Scott Shaver
Jeremiah Jake Teeple

Results

Notes

References

legislature
Nebraska